The center of gravity (CoG) is a concept developed by Carl Von Clausewitz, a Prussian military theorist, in his work On War.

United States
The definition of a CoG, as given by the United States Department of Defense, is "the source of power that provides moral or physical strength, freedom of action, or will to act." Thus, the center of gravity is usually seen as the "source of strength".

The United States Army tends to look for a single center of gravity, normally in the principal capability that stands in the way of the accomplishment of its own mission. In short, the army considers a "friendly" CoG as that element—a characteristic, capability, or locality—that enables one's own or allied forces to accomplish their objectives. Conversely, an opponent's CoG is that element that prevents friendly forces from accomplishing their objectives.

For example, according to US Army Counterinsurgency Field Manual 3-24, the center of gravity in a counterinsurgency is the protection of the population that hosts it.

See also
 U.S. Army Strategist

References

External links
 From Strategic Studies Institute, U.S. Army War College:  Clausewitz's Center of Gravity: Changing Our Warfighting Doctrine--Again! 
 Reining in” the Center of Gravity Concept
 The Relevance of Carl Von Clausewitz in Operation Iraqi Freedom
 JP 1-02, US DoD Dictionary of Military and Associated Terms

Military strategy